Uuden edessä is a song by Finnish group Toivon Kärki, released on 10 April 2020 through Warner Music Finland. The proceeds of the song were directed to Finnish Red Cross to help people in Finland who have been affected by COVID-19 pandemic. The song was written by Lauri Tähkä and Timo Kiiskinen and produced by Jukka Immonen, Jurek, Antti Riihimäki and Eppu Kosonen.

Artists and musicians 
The song features 90 artists and 60 other music makers.

 Abreu
 Aki Tykki
 Ako Kiiski
 Aleksanteri Hakaniemi
 Alma
 Alpo Nummelin
 Anna Puu
 Anssi Kela
 Antti Ketonen
 Antti Lehtinen
 Arttu Peljo
 Arttu Wiskari
 Behm
 Brädi
 Chisu
 Cledos
 Costee
 Costello Hautamäki
 Dalia Porra
 Darude
 DJPP
 Elastinen
 Elias Kaskinen
 Ellinoora
 Eppu Kosonen
 Erin
 Eva & Manu
 F
 Gracias
 Gugi
 Haloo Helsinki!
 Hannu Korkeamäki
 Heikki Kytölä
 HesaÄijä
 Heviteemu
 Ida Paul
 Ilkka Alanko
 Ilkka Tolonen
 Ilkka Wirtanen
 Ilta
 Irina
 Jaakko Kääriäinen
 Janna
 Jannika B
 Jari Väyliö
 Jarkko Kumpulainen
 Jaron & Istala
 Jay Kortehisto
 Jenni Mustajärvi
 Jenni Vartiainen
 Jesse Markin
 Joel Melasniemi
 Jonna Tervomaa
 Jori Sjöroos
 Jouni Aslak
 Juha Kuoppala
 Jukka Eskola
 Jukka Immonen
 Jukka Poika
 Jurek
 Jussi Rainio
 JVG
 Kaija Koo
 Kalevi Louhivuori
 Kalle Lindroth
 Kalle Mäkipelto
 Kalle Torniainen
 Karri Koira
 Katri Helena
 Katri Ylander
 Knipi
 Kyösti Mäkimattila
 Lasse Enersen
 Lasse Kurki
 Lasse Piirainen
 Laura Närhi
 Laura Voutilainen
 Lauri Porra
 Lauri Tähkä
 Lenni-Kalle Taipale
 Leri Leskinen
 Lukas Leon
 Maarit
 Maija Vilkkumaa
 Mariska
 Matias Keskiruokanen
 Matti Mikkola
 Michael Monroe
 Mikael Gabriel
 Mikko Harju
 Mikko Kaakkuriniemi
 Mikko Kosonen
 Minna Koivisto
 Mira Luoti
 Nelli Matula
 Olavi Uusivirta
 OP Beats
 Osmo Ikonen
 Paleface
 Pasi ja Anssi
 PastoriPike
 Pauli Hanhiniemi
 Pete Parkkonen
 Pikku G
 Portion Boys
 Rafael Elivuo
 Redrama
 Reino Nordin
 Ressu Redford
 Riku Rajamaa
 Risto Asikainen
 Risto Niinikoski
 Risto Rikala
 Roope Salminen
 Rzy
 Saara Aalto
 Sakke Aalto
 Sami Yaffa
 Sami Kuoppamäki
 Sami Osala
 Sampo Haapaniemi
 Samu Haber
 Samuli Edelmann
 Samuli Sirviö
 Sanni
 Sara Siipola
 Seksikäs-Suklaa
 Sini Yasemin
 Skywalk
 Stig
 Suvi Teräsniska
 Svante Forsbäck
 Teleks
 Tero Palo
 Tero Sundell
 Tero Vesterinen
 Thomas Rönnholm
 Tido
 Timo Kiiskinen
 Timo Kämäräinen
 Timo Lassy
 Tippa
 Titta
 Tomi Saario
 Tommi Läntinen
 Toni Kulku
 Toni Wirtanen
 Tuukka Tuunanen
 Tuure Boelius
 Tuure Kilpeläinen
 Uniikki
 Vesala
 
 Viivi
 Vilma Alina
 Waltteri Torikka
 Younghearted

Charts

References

2020 songs
All-star recordings
Charity singles